K.H. Muhammad Wahib Wahab (born in Rice Embankment, Jombang, East Java, Indonesia on November 1, 1918 - died in Jakarta, Indonesia on July 12, 1986 at the age of 67 years) once served as Minister of Religious Affairs. He was the first son of Wahab Hasbullah one of the founding initiator Nahdlatul Ulama.

Government ministers of Indonesia
People from Jombang Regency
Indonesian religious leaders
Politicians from East Java
Javanese people
1918 births
1986 deaths
Indonesian Sunni Muslims